David Goffin was the defending champion, but withdrew before the tournament began.

Philipp Kohlschreiber won the title, defeating Paul-Henri Mathieu in the final, 2–6, 6–2, 6–2.

Seeds
The top four seeds receive a bye into the second round.

Draw

Finals

Top half

Bottom half

Qualifying

Seeds

Qualifiers

Lucky loser
  Albert Montañés

Qualifying draw

First qualifier

Second qualifier

Third qualifier

Fourth qualifier

References
 Main Draw
 Qualifying Draw

2015 ATP World Tour
2015 Singles